Ticketclever (styled as ticketclever) was an online retail website/online shopping for train tickets for services in the United Kingdom. Ticketclever created an algorithm that sought numerous ticket combinations from the hundreds of millions of different route combinations and packages them together for a given journey.

Ticketclever was based in Oxford with offices in London and Cape Town, South Africa.

History
Global Travel Ventures Ltd. (GTV) had been developing TicketClever (initially called FareMaster) since 2014. Ticketclever.com was launched in January 2017. Jeremy Acklam, previously from Trainline was the co-founder and CEO. In March 2017, ticketclever announced they were partnering with the charity St John Ambulance, where you could donate an amount to the charity once you purchase a train ticket. GTV sold a 20% stake of the company to train operating company Stagecoach Group in June 2017. Account-based version of ticketclever - also known as MultiPass - was conceived and developed by TEDIPAY (UK) Ltd, headed by its Founder and CEO, Alexander Peschkoff.

Algorithm
Ticketclever tried to use analytics and data science to try and find the lowest price. Ticketclever employed three Oxford University alumni, two with Doctor of Philosophy in Particle Physics, one with a Doctor of Philosophy in Engineering Science to create an algorithm that filters data sets from the Rail Delivery Group, which represent 25 train operating companies in Great Britain that are responsible for running trains and setting the price of the fares. Ticketclever used this algorithm to find multi-ticket fare deals on Great Britain’s railway network.

Refunds
Ticketclever was able to issue refunds in accordance with the National Rail Conditions of Travel if the circumstances allowed for a refund. The eligibility to change or cancel tickets varied depending on the type of ticket purchased. Companies could choose to charge an administration fee of up to £10 according to the National Rail Conditions of Carriage for refunds.

References

British travel websites
Fare collection systems in the United Kingdom
Route planning software
Stagecoach Group
2016 establishments in England
2018 disestablishments in England